Willard and Josephine Hubbard House is a historic home located at Indianapolis, Indiana.  It was built in 1903, and is a -story, five-bay, center-hall plan, Italian Renaissance Revival style limestone dwelling with an addition. It features a front wooden portico supported by Ionic order columns and a semi-circular front section. Also on the property is a contributing carriage house / garage.

It was listed on the National Register of Historic Places in 2016.  It is located in the Herron-Morton Place Historic District.

References

Individually listed contributing properties to historic districts on the National Register in Indiana
Houses on the National Register of Historic Places in Indiana
Renaissance Revival architecture in Indiana
Houses completed in 1903
Houses in Indianapolis
National Register of Historic Places in Indianapolis